The Kaimanawa Range, officially called the Kaimanawa Mountains since 16 July 2020, is a range of mountains in the central North Island of New Zealand. They extend for 50 kilometres in a northeast/southwest direction through largely uninhabited country to the south of Lake Taupō, east of the "Desert Road". Their slopes form part of the North Island Volcanic Plateau.

The New Zealand Ministry for Culture and Heritage gives a translation of "breath for food" for Kaimanawa.

The lands around the mountains are scrubby. To the west, where the Rangipo Desert is located, the soils are poor quality. To the east, the soils are more fertile, but the land is very rough. A population of feral horses, the Kaimanawa horses, roam free on the ranges.

Unlike the majority of mountain ranges in New Zealand, the Kaimanawa Range is divided into private land. Considerable areas of the Rangipo Desert are used by the New Zealand Army for training.

Demographics
The very low population figure and rounding of numbers results in some odd figures in the census results.

Kaimanawa had a population of 180 at the 2018 New Zealand census, an increase of 174 people (2900.0%) since the 2013 census, and an increase of 123 people (215.8%) since the 2006 census. There were 0 households, comprising 177 males and 0 females. The median age was 47.3 years (compared with 37.4 years nationally), with 0 people (0.0%) aged under 15 years, 27 (15.0%) aged 15 to 29, 126 (70.0%) aged 30 to 64, and 30 (16.7%) aged 65 or older.

Ethnicities were 60.0% European/Pākehā, 48.3% Māori, 5.0% Pacific peoples, 1.7% Asian, and 1.7% other ethnicities. People may identify with more than one ethnicity.

The percentage of people born overseas was 8.3, compared with 27.1% nationally.

Although some people chose not to answer the census's question about religious affiliation, 45.0% had no religion, 31.7% were Christian, 8.3% had Māori religious beliefs and 5.0% had other religions.

Of those at least 15 years old, 9 (5.0%) people had a bachelor's or higher degree, and 51 (28.3%) people had no formal qualifications. The median income was $1,100, compared with $31,800 nationally. 3 people (1.7%) earned over $70,000 compared to 17.2% nationally. The employment status of those at least 15 was that 42 (23.3%) people were employed full-time, 36 (20.0%) were part-time, and 9 (5.0%) were unemployed.

Kaimanawa Wall 

Within the Kaimanawa State Forest area is the Kaimanawa Wall.

The Tuwharetoa tangata whenua claim an “oral tradition” of the place as a kōhatu (rock). A popular theory is that the wall is a human construction. From that popular theory, a pseudoscience theory explains the wall as a pre-Māori civilization artifact.

The wall formation was inspected by an anthropologist and a geologist; neither saw evidence of a human origin. In a preliminary investigation, anthropologist Neville Ritchie of the New Zealand Department of Conservation, observed "matching micro-irregularities along the joints." This indicated that the blocks in the wall were too perfectly matched. He also observed the joints were neither straight nor truly horizontal nor perpendicular, indicating the joint alignments were too poorly constructed.

Ritchie concluded the blocks are a natural formation based on the presence of matching micro-irregularities in blocks and imperfect joint alignment.

Peter Wood, of the Institute of Geological and Nuclear Sciences at Wairakei, inspected the blocks for an afternoon and concluded they are natural fractures in what Wood termed "Jointed-Rangitaiki-Ignimbrite," and described as "330,000 year old volcanic rock that is common in the Taupō Volcanic Zone." Both vertical and horizontal joints are common. Fractures in the Rangitaiki ignimbrite formed when it cooled and contracted after flowing into place during an eruption.

References

Mountain ranges of New Zealand
Taupō District
Ruapehu District
Rangitikei District
Populated places in Manawatū-Whanganui